The first competition weekend of the 2015–16 ISU Speed Skating World Cup was held in the Olympic Oval in Calgary, Alberta, Canada, from Friday, 13 November, until Sunday, 15 November 2015.

The weekend saw five world records. On Saturday, Heather Richardson-Bergsma of the United States beat fellow American Brittany Bowe's 1000 m world record from 2013. Bowe, who skated in the pairing before Richardson, also skated better than the old record, and finished second, 3/100 behind Richardson. World records were also noted in the team sprints, as they were raced officially for the first time, with the Dutch team winning the men's race, and the Japanese team winning the women's race.

On Sunday, Bowe beat the 1500 m world record, held by Cindy Klassen of Canada since 2005. In the men's 500 metres, Russian Pavel Kulizhnikov set a new world record in the Sunday race, stripping Jeremy Wotherspoon of Canada of the record he had held since 2007. Kulizhnikov had previously won the Friday race in a time that was a new national record.

Schedule
The detailed schedule of events:

All times are MST (UTC−7).

Medal summary

Men's events

 In mass start, race points are accumulated during the race. The skater with most race points is the winner.

Women's events

 In mass start, race points are accumulated during the race. The skater with most race points is the winner.

Standings
The top ten standings in the contested cups after the weekend. The top five nations in the team pursuit and team sprint cups.

Men's cups

500 m

1000 m

1500 m

5000/10000 m

Mass start

Team pursuit

Team sprint

Grand World Cup

Women's cups

500 m

1000 m

1500 m

3000/5000 m

Mass start

Team pursuit

Team sprint

Grand World Cup

References

 
1
Isu World Cup, 2015-16, 1
Sport in Calgary
2015 in Alberta